John Widman is an American luthier who makes high-end, hand-built guitars.

He grew up in the Asheville, North Carolina area. After graduating from North Carolina State University (1984) and working as a photographer and graphic designer, he turned to building high-end electric guitars under the name Widman Custom Electrics, from Arden, North Carolina. Woods and hardware are specified by the customer. Besides vintage-styled guitars, he also builds electric banjos.

References

External links
Official website

Living people
Guitar makers
North Carolina State University alumni
People from Asheville, North Carolina
People from Arden, North Carolina
Year of birth missing (living people)